The 18103 / 18104 Tatanagar -Amritsar Jallianwalla Bagh Express is an Express train belonging to South Eastern Railway zone that runs between  and  in India. It is currently being operated with 18103/18104 train numbers on bi-weekly basis.

Service

The 18103 Jallianwalabagh Express has an average speed of 52 km/hr and covers 1747 km in 33h 20m. The 18104 Jallianwalabagh Express has an average speed of 54 km/hr and covers 1747 km in 32h 25m.

Route & Halts 

The important halts of the train are:

 
 
 
 
 
 
 
 
 
 
 ,

Coach composition

The train has Modern LHB Rakes with a max speed of 110 kmph. The train consists of 22 coaches :

 1 AC II Tier
 5 AC III Tier
 10 Sleeper Coaches
 3 Second Sitting cum General Coaches
1 Pantry Car Coach
1 Divyangjan cum Guard Coach
1 Generator Car

Traction

Both trains are hauled by a Tatanagar-based WAP-7 electric locomotive from Tatanagar to Amritsar, and vice versa.

Rake sharing

The train shared its rake with 12889/12890 Tatanagar–SMVT Bengaluru Weekly Superfast Express.

Schedule

See also 

 Tatanagar Junction railway station
 Amritsar Junction railway station
 Jallianwalla Bagh Express
 Tatanagar–SMVT Bengaluru Weekly Superfast Express

Notes

References

External links 

 18103/Jallianwalabagh Express
 18104/Jallianwalabagh Express

Transport in Jamshedpur
Transport in Amritsar
Express trains in India
Rail transport in West Bengal
Rail transport in Jharkhand
Rail transport in Uttar Pradesh
Rail transport in Bihar
Rail transport in Uttarakhand
Rail transport in Haryana
Rail transport in Punjab, India
Railway services introduced in 2003